Sir Herbert Scarisbrick Naylor-Leyland, 1st Baronet (24 January 1864 – 7 May 1899), was a British politician.

Biography

Early life
Naylor-Leyland was the only son of Colonel Tom Naylor-Leyland, of Nantclwyd Hall, Ruthin, Denbighshire, by Mary Anne, only daughter of the late Charles Scarisbrick, of Scarisbrick and Wrightington, Lancashire, and was born on 24 January 1864.  He was educated at the Royal Military College, Sandhurst, and entered the Second Life Guards in 1882, becoming Captain in 1891. From 1892, he pursued a political career.

Career
Naylor-Leyland was returned to Parliament for Colchester as a Conservative in 1892, a seat he held until 1895 when he accepted the Chiltern Hundreds. The latter year he was created a Baronet, of Hyde Park House, Albert Gate, in the County of London. He took his title from Hyde Park House (60 Knightsbridge, now the Royal Thames Yacht Club), a mansion built in 1855 for his grandfather, the banker Thomas Leyland, by Thomas Cubitt.  He then broke with the Conservatives and joined the Liberal Party (it was said that he was rewarded with a Baronetcy because he changed from being a Conservative to Liberal and voting with the Liberals and winning an important vote), and represented Southport in this party's interest between 1898 and his early death in May 1899 of laryngitis, aged only 35.

Personal life

He was married at St George's, Hanover Square, London, on 14 September 1889 (aged 25) to Jeanie Willson Chamberlain (1864–1932), daughter of Mr and Mrs William Selah Chamberlain, of Cleveland, Ohio, USA; they had two sons:
 Albert Edward Herbert Naylor-Leyland (b. 6 December 1890; d. 1952), who succeeded 1899 to his father's baronetcy, aged 8.
 George Vyvyan Naylor-Leyland (b. 1892; killed in action on 21 September 1914, aged 22), who was educated at Eton.

His wife's beauty and wit reportedly played a major role in her husband's return to politics in 1898. They were part of the Prince of Wales's set, and had their country seat at Lexden Park, Colchester.

References

Sources
"Captain Naylor-Leyland dead" (Abstract) (full text) The New York Times, 8 May 1899. Retrieved 8 May 2008.

References
Kidd, Charles, Williamson, David (editors). Debrett's Peerage and Baronetage (1990 edition). New York: St Martin's Press, 1990.

External links 
 

1864 births
1899 deaths
Baronets in the Baronetage of the United Kingdom
UK MPs 1892–1895
UK MPs 1895–1900
Conservative Party (UK) MPs for English constituencies
Liberal Party (UK) MPs for English constituencies
Southport
Graduates of the Royal Military College, Sandhurst
British Life Guards officers
Herbert
Respiratory disease deaths in England